Trung Vuong (vi:Trưng Vương) may refer to:  
"Trưng 'King'" or "Trưng Queen (regnant)", Trưng Trắc, the older of the Trưng Sisters: leaders who rebelled against Chinese rule for three years, and are regarded as national heroines of Vietnam.

Schools 
Trưng Vương Junior Secondary School, Hanoi: a junior secondary school in Hanoi, Vietnam
Trưng Vương Junior Secondary School, Nha Trang: a junior secondary school in Nha Trang, Vietnam